Örn Árnason (born 19 June 1959) is an Icelandic actor, comedian and screenwriter, best known as a member of the comedy group Spaugstofan.  He has starred in a number of films and television series since the 1980s, as well as acting in the National Theatre of Iceland. He is noted for his satirical portrayals of public figures, including former Icelandic Prime Minister Davíð Oddsson. Örn hosted the children's morning program Með Afa on Stöð 2. He is the son of actor Árni Tryggvason.

Selected filmography 
 Bjarnfreðarson (2009)
 Stella í framboði (2002)
 Stikkfrí (1997)
 Stuttur frakki (1993)
 Karlakórinn Hekla (1992)
 Magnús (1989)
 Stella í orlofi (1986)
 LazyTown (2007)

References

External links 
 

 

Arnason, Orn
Arnason, Orn
Icelandic male film actors
Icelandic male stage actors
Icelandic male television actors